Doc Watson's discography includes principal albums as a solo artist, as well as with his son Merle Watson, The Watson Family and as collaborator with other artists.

Studio and live albums

With The Watson Family or The Doc Watson Family

Collaborations

Compilations

Singles

References

External links
 Doc Watson discography
 The Watson Family discography

Watson, Doc
 
Discographies of American artists